Scelotes fitzsimonsi, Fitzsimons' dwarf burrowing skink, is a species of lizard which is found in South Africa and Mozambique.

References

fitzsimonsi
Reptiles of Mozambique
Reptiles of South Africa
Reptiles described in 1994
Taxa named by Donald George Broadley